In the inguinal crest of a peculiar structure, the gubernaculum testis makes its appearance. This is at first a slender band, extending from that part of the skin of the groin which afterward forms the scrotum through the inguinal canal to the body and epididymis of the testis.

External links
 Images

Embryology